This is a list of flag bearers who have represented Antigua and Barbuda at the Olympics.

Flag bearers carry the national flag of their country at the opening ceremony of the Olympic Games.

See also
Antigua and Barbuda at the Olympics

References

Antigua and Barbuda at the Olympics
Antigua
Olympic